Thakurpukur is a region of South West Kolkata in Behala area of the Indian state of West Bengal. It is majorly a residential region. It has been rapidly developed in the last 20 years and what was a jungle before is now an urban agglomeration in Kolkata's South. Thakurpukur was also under the Barisha area of Sabarna Roy Choudhury's zamindari era.

Administration

Police district
Thakurpukur police station is part of the South West division(Behala Division) of Kolkata Police. It is located at 123/117, Diamond Harbour Road, Kolkata-700063.

Behala Women police station, located at the same address as above, covers all police districts under the jurisdiction of the South West division i.e. Sarsuna, Taratala, Behala, Parnasree, Thakurpukur, and Haridevpur.

Jadavpur, Thakurpukur, Behala, Purba Jadavpur, Tiljala, Regent Park, Metiabruz, Nadial, and Kasba police stations were transferred from South 24 Parganas to Kolkata in 2011. Except for Metiabruz, all the police stations were split into two. The new police stations are Parnasree, Haridevpur, Garfa, Patuli, Survey Park, Pragati Maidan, Bansdroni and Rajabagan.

Education
Vivekananda College was established at Barisha in 1950 as Barisha College, renamed Vivekananda College in 1956 and shifted to Thakurpukur in 1959. Affiliated with the University of Calcutta, it offers honours courses in Bengali, English, Sanskrit, history, philosophy, political science, journalism & mass communications, physics, chemistry, mathematics, economics, botany, zoology, computer science, biochemistry, and environmental science.

Other Educational Institutions nearby are
 Vivekananda College for Women
 El Bethel School
 M.P.Birla School
 Sarsuna College
 Sarsuna Law College
 National Gems School
 Barisha Purba Para High school 
 Barisha Vivekananda Boys High School
 Barisha Vivekananda Girls High School
 Gournagar High School

Some popular coaching centers and career counselling services nearby are
 Pathfinder
 Allen Coaching
 Naboday Coaching
 Mashtishkam
 Alankrita Careers and Alankrita Tutorials
 I leap
 RICE
 ICA
and many more.

Market

Thakurpukur Bazar is one of the biggest and most versatile market in South Kolkata. Starting from vegetables, meat, fish, groceries stores up to clothing, electronics, gadgets all kind of necessary commodities are available here.

Shopping complexes like Reliance Trends and Reliance Digital and many renowned motorbike showrooms are situated in Thakurpukur.

Hospitals and Treatment Centres

One of the oldest cancer treatment centre of Kolkata is situated here as Saroj Gupta Cancer Centre and Research Institute, Which is located off the Mahatma Gandhi Road. The hospital is locally known as Thakurpukur Cancer Hospital. This hospital is one of the important landmark of this area.

Besides Cancer Hospital, many other hospitals and treatment centres are available here like D.M Hospital, Apollo Clinic, Swadesh Basu Hospital, BMRI Hospital, Kasturi Medical center, Advanced Neuropsychiatry Institute, Humanity Hospital etc.

References

External links

Neighbourhoods in Kolkata